Farbill is a barony in east County Westmeath, in the Republic of Ireland. It was formed by 1672. It is bordered by County Meath to the south and east and three other baronies: Fartullagh (to the south–west), Moyashel and Magheradernon (to the north–east) and Delvin (to the north). The largest centre of population in the barony is the town of Kinnegad.

Geography
The M4 motorway passes to the south of Kinnegad connecting Dublin with Sligo and the M6 motorway from Galway joins the M4 at Kinnegad. Several regional roads radiate from Kinnegad. Those passing through Farbill are the R148 to Dublin and the R161 to Navan. To the north the R156 passes through Killucan linking the N3 near Clonee in County Meath to the N4 (near Mullingar).

A railway line carrying the national rail company Iarnród Éireann's Dublin to Longford commuter service and Dublin to Sligo intercity service. also passes through the barony.  The Royal Canal follows a similar route through Farbill connecting the River Liffey in Dublin to Longford town.

Civil parishes of the barony 
This table lists an historical geographical sub-division of the barony known as the civil parish (not to be confused with an Ecclesiastical parish).

The barony of Farbill consists of just one civil parish, Killucan, however two townlands of Killucan, Greenan, and Mucklin, are in the barony of Delvin.

Towns, villages and townlands
There are 76 townlands in the barony of Farbill. Villages include:

Coralstown
The Downs, about 5 miles east of Mullingar
Killucan
Kinnegad
Raharney
Rathwire

References

External links
Map of Farbill at openstreetmap.org
Barony of Farbill, County Westmeath at Townlands.ie

Baronies of County Westmeath